Qaderlu may refer to:
 Qaderlu, Ardabil
 Qaderlu, Zanjan